Kilberry Castle is a Category B listed country house near Kilberry in South Knapdale in the county of Argyll, in western Scotland on the shores of the Sound of Jura.

History and architecture
The castle is said to have been built at the end of the fifteenth century. The MacMurachies are understood to have owned the castle under the Lords of the Isles and they were followed by the Earls of Argyll. Eventually the Campbells of Kilberry took up residence in the early 16th century. During the civil war the castle was besieged by royalist forces between 1643 and 1645.

In 1733 the Campbell mausoleum was built by Dugald Campbell 6th of Kilberry. The castle was accidentally burned down in 1772 or 1773. Although it continued to be occupied, a proper restoration was not undertaken until 1844 when John Campbell, 5th of Knockbury and 9th of Kilberry commissioned its rebuilding in 1844 by the architect David Bryce. John Campbell, 6th of Knockbury and 10th of Kilberry commissioned further extensions in 1873 by Charles Kinnear of Edinburgh. The works were carried out by Mr Harris, builder of St Andrew’s.

John Campbell's daughter Marion Campbell (later a noted archaeologist) inherited Kilberry when she was 8 years old, following her father's death. The estate was sold to an older cousin, but Campbell regained possession of it once she turned 18.

The castle was advertised for sale in 2021 with an asking price of in excess of £650,000.

References

Category B listed buildings in Argyll and Bute
Country houses in Argyll and Bute
Historic house museums in Argyll and Bute